Antwerp International Airport  is a small international airport serving the City of Antwerp in the Province of Antwerp in the Flemish Region of Belgium.

History

After the first flying events at the Wilrijkse Plein, work on a proper airport for the city started in 1921, under the impulse of pioneer aviator Jan Olieslagers and others. Sabena operated passenger services from 1924 from an old railway carriage as the only passenger infrastructure. A proper airport terminal was ordered by minister Maurice Lippens and inaugurated in 1930.

The airport was home to the aircraft factory Stampe et Vertongen until its demise after World War II.

During World War II the airport was used by the Luftwaffe, and also served the nearby Erla aircraft factory. After the German retreat in 1944, it saw brief use by Allied air forces, who called it Advanced Landing Ground B-70.

Antwerp Airport was home to VLM Airlines from end 2014, since independence from CityJet. VLM was offering flights from Antwerp to Hamburg and Friedrichshafen and was flying on behalf of CityJet on the route Antwerp - London City. However the airline declared bankruptcy on 22 June 2016 due to cancellations of ACMI contracts by People's. Due to VLM's demise, their ACMI customer CityJet handed over the operations of VLM's former service from London City Airport to Antwerp to Danish Air Transport. The Antwerp to Hamburg service was taken over by Chalair Aviation but has been discontinued.

On 6 August 2018, the revived VLM Airlines announced the termination of five scheduled routes with another new one not commencing in the coming weeks and that instead it would focus on charter operations. On 31 August 2018 however, VLM Airlines announced the immediate stop of all of their operations from Antwerp.

After the demise of VLM, Air Antwerp was created. It announced a thrice-daily service to London City Airport from September 2019. However, in the wake of the COVID-19 pandemic, the airline announced the suspension of the route as of May 2021 before shutting down altogether in June 2021.

Infrastructure

Facilities
The airport consists of one small passenger terminal with basic facilities including service desks, a small bar/coffeeshop in the entrance hall and at the gate, and a bar/restaurant with a terrace. The apron features ten stands for smaller airliners such as the Fokker 50. As there are no jet bridges, walk-boarding is used.

Operator
The airport was operated by the Department of Mobility and Public Works of the Flemish Government which made an agreement with the French engineering group Egis Group to operate it for 25 years, starting in 2014.

Airlines and destinations

The following airline operates regular scheduled and seasonal flights at Antwerp International Airport:

Statistics

Source numbers 2004-2014: Antwerp Airport ″Annual report 2014″ 

Source numbers 2014-present: Federal Public Service Mobility and Transport: ″Airport statistics″

Ground transportation

By bus 
Buses 51, 52 and 53 connect the airport with the Antwerpen-Berchem railway station which operates local, intercity and international trains. These buses are operated by De Lijn.

Other uses
The airport is home to several flying schools, aircraft maintenance and repair workshops, operators of business jets, to several hangars for private aircraft, and to the Museum Stampe-Vertongen.

Accidents & Incidents
On September 8, 2022, a Cessna Citation business jet operated by GlobeAir overshot runway 11 while landing at Antwerp. Nobody onboard, including Dutch DJ Afrojack, was injured, and the aircraft reportedly did not sustain damage. As of September 2022, the incident is under investigation.

See also
 Transport in Belgium

References

Notes

External links

 

Airports in Antwerp Province
Buildings and structures in Antwerp
Airports established in 1924
1924 establishments in Belgium